Clive Parker (born 1960) also known as Clive Parker-Sharp, is an English drummer, active in the punk, post-punk and new wave genres. He was a member of the bands The Members, Spizzenergi/Athletico Spizz 80, Big Country, and Scary Thieves. He went on to play with John Moore (Jesus and Mary Chain.) in The Expressway.

Parker had his own bands The Planets, Lopez & the Waveriders, Kingfishers Catch Fire, Holy Trinity, Barra (Sony-ATV/English Garden Records), and electronic guitar duo Marshall Star. He went on to production and management, forming his own small record label (Furry Records UK)

In 1992, Parker had a minor dance hit with UK soul singer, Kasie Sharp, co-writing as part of the pop dance production team One Horse Man, who were also released by Arcade Records in Europe.

Personal background 
Parker was born in Windlesham, Surrey. He lives in East Sussex. He is now also a writer & published author, and plays guitar and keyboards.

Professional background 
From the age of nine, Parker played in local show bands and working men's club's (Frimley Green;Camberley). He also joined punk rock groups in Camberley, the Home Counties, and West London circuits, often as an opening act to groups like The Members, Eddie and the Hot Rods, and others who performed at The Moonlight Club in Hampstead, and Nashville Rooms in West Kensington.

Parker plays with a traditional and matched grip, later double-bass drums, heavily influenced by Keith Moon and John Bonham, style non-strict and sometimes experimental or chaotic.

In 1979, Parker joined Spizzenergi, after auditioning at a small rehearsal room in arches at Waterloo, London. Spizzenergi was a late 1970s punk rock/new wave band that changed its name several times during its existence. Alternative names including Spizzoil and Athletico Spizz 80.

In 1980, as Athletico Spizz 80, Parker played on the album, Do a Runner, which spent five weeks on the UK Albums Chart, peaking at number 27. The album was recorded and mixed at Berry Street studios in London over the spring bank holiday weekend, and featured Jim Solar, Mark Coalfield, and Dave Scott in the line up.

In 1980, the group appeared at the Futurama Festival, along with Gary Glitter and Joy Division. The festival, which was recorded for the film Urgh! A Music War, took place at Leeds Queens Hall.

Tours 
In 1980, after signing with A&M Records, the band toured the United States with 999. During the tour, and with Solar, Spizz and Lu Edmonds from The Damned as the line up, they played the Palladium in New York City as support band to Siouxsie and the Banshees.

Spizz
Parker toured with Spizz, extensively in Europe and the United States, in support of The Clash, The Only Ones, and the Human League. Support bands for Spizz tours included Tenpole Tudor, Altered Images, Department S, and The Mo-dettes. The band played a week of sold-out shows at London's Marquee Club, with a matinee for younger fans.

Big Country
Parker toured with Big Country, playing at the Dunfermline Glen Pavilion (first ever BC gig), and dates with Alice Cooper Armed Forces tour.

Scary Thieves
Parker toured the UK with Scary Thieves and Nik Kershaw.

John Moore
Parker toured the UK with John Moore and Pop Will Eat Itself, Crazyhead, and Living Colour. Dates in the United States, in addition to solo appearances, included performances with My Bloody Valentine.

Kingfishers Catch Fire
Kingfishers Catch Fire played support to Deacon Blue, and toured the UK college circuit after a favourable showing in Melody Maker, by writer Helen Fitzgerald.

Literary 
The Box. - an historical biographical novel was released by Strand Publishing in 2012.
ConeBoy. - A semi-autobiographical novel released October 2018 by Box Productions.
 'Sex Drugs & Music-Hall'
2013–2014; Parker toured his show, ‘Sex Drugs & Music-Hall‘, the adaptation of his book ‘The Box’ which took a skewed view of UK cultural populist history; Bingo, and Music-Hall, using spoken-word, drama, and music, with Parker playing guitar, keyboards, and wood-blocks.  This was played in unusual venues, such as Museums, Libraries, Almshouses, and some Theatres.
 'ConeBoy'
2020 on: Parker tours his ConeBoy show; musical, dramatic and spoken-word adaptations of the ConeBoy novel.

British Library 
Do A Runner. - The Athletico Spizz 80 album is now housed in the British Library, as a reference tool.

The Box. is housed in The British Library as a reference tool British Library .

Films 
Urgh! A Music War.  Two songs from Athletico Spizz 80.
Unbidden 2016 – Director; Quentin Lee.  Marshall Star   contribute music to this release.
My Name Is Lenny. 2017 - Director; Ron Scalpello. The British Sports drama movie features the Athletico Spizz 80 track 'Red & Black' (writer 'Spizz'), along with a Marshall Star song 'The Narcissist', (Parker).

Discography

Singles 
Spizz
 Athletico Spizz 80: June 1980 "No Room" "Spock's Missing" Rough Trade
 Athletico Spizz 80: July 1980 "Hot Deserts" "Legal Proceedings" A&M
 Athletico Spizz 80: October 1980 "Central Park" "Central Park" (Dr. & Nurses dub version) A&M
 The Spizzles: February 1981 "Risk" "Melancholy" A&M
 The Spizzles: April 1981 "Dangers of Living" "Scared" A&M

Athletico Spizz 80, BBC John Peel session 30 April 1980 
Athletico Spizz 80, BBC Mike Read session 2 October 1980 

Scary Thieves
 "Tell Me Girl" (3:48)/"Only Fascination" (3:45) (7" Parlophone, 1984)
 "Tell Me Girl" (6:37)/"Tell Me Girl" (3:48)/"Only Fascination" (3:45) (12" Parlophone, 1984)
 "Dying In Vain" (3:11)/"Behind The Lines" (4:00) (7" Parlophone, 1985)
 "Dying In Vain" (Extended Version)/"Dying In Vain" (Remix)/"Behind The Lines" (12" Parlophone, 1985)
 "The Waiting Game" (Extended Version) (6:19)/"The Waiting Game" (Radio Version) (4:13)/"Live In Another Day" (2:55) (12" Parlophone, 1985) – first pressing with limited edition poster
 "Tell Me Girl" (Extended Version) (6:29)/"Tell Me Girl" (Radio Version) (3:54)/"Only Fascination" (3:45) (12" More Disco, 1994)

Kingfishers Catch Fire
 "Radio Kampala"/"Bella"/"Battle Scars", 12" vinyl EP, 1986 Furry/Rough Trade
 "Blushing Red"/"Never Never", vinyl limited edition double A-side, 1987 Furry/Rough Trade

Kasie Sharp
 "Pulling the Strings" (mixes by Stonebridge, Sharp Boys, Kamasutra), Undiscovered, 1996

One Horse Man
 "Fuego"/"Bamba Generation", double A-side 12" vinyl, Royal/Arcade

Marshall Star
 "Get On"/"Heaven Help Me", 2000, Furry, promo CD and download only
 "Any Second Now"/"Dream On", double A-side vinyl, Furry, 2003

Albums 
Spizz
 Do a Runner (as Athletico Spizz 80) (July 1980: A&M)
 Spikey Dream Flowers (as The Spizzles) (April 1981: A&M)
 Do a Runner (as Athletico Spizz 80) (February 2014; Furry Records UK) – Touched, New Species, Intimate, Effortless, European Heroes, Energy Crisis, Red and Black, Rhythm Inside, Personimpersonator, Clocks are Big, Airships, Brainwashing Time, Five Year Mission, Dangers of Living, Robot Holiday, Soldier Soldier, Downtown, Risk, Central Park, Melancholy, Scared 

Big Country
  'Rarities IV' TRA1037 (October 2003) – Lost Patrol, The Crossing, Echoes, Wake 
  'And...  in the Beginning', KCF116 (December 2012) – Lost Patrol 4:20,  Wake 4:18,  The Crossing 4:21,  Echoes 3:20,  BBC Radio Interview 0:42,  Echoes 6:23,   Inwards 3:56,  Lost Patrol 5:58,  Balcony 5:13,  Round & Round 6:16,  Close Action 3:20,  Porrohman 5:21,  The Crossing 7:18,  Heart & Soul 4:53,  Harvest Home 3:57,  Angle Park 4:14 

Scary Thieves
 Scary Thieves – FURRY RECORDS April 2015 catalogue No. KCF118   – Inside the Night (3:46)/ Game of Love (4:19)/ Tell Me Girl (3:57)/ The Waiting Game (4:27)/ Halloween (3:08)/ Live In Another Day (2:55)/ Dying In Vain (3:17)/ Fascination (3:45)/ Somebody Somewhere (3:54)/ Thieves of Virtue (5:19)/ Behind the Lines (4:09)/ Dying in Vain (Single Edit) (3:25)/ The Waiting Game (Extended) (6:15)/ Dying in Vain (Extended) (5:80)/ Tell me Girl (Extended) (6:35)/ Dying in Vain (Remix) (5:08)

Barra
 Eternal Magus – English Garden/Hi-Note Music, (Sony-ATV) 2002  – Eternal Magus, Gifts for Violet, Gnosis, Green Man, Journey, Palestine, Seafever, Universe, Battlescars, Badda, Never Never, Silverman, Blushing Red, Power of Three, Seafever [version 2]

Marshall Star 
 Uncontrollable – Furry KCF 114, 2004; Everybody, Fallen Angel, Wish I, My Love, Never met a Man, Love is All, Dream On, Will you (turn it up), Superstar, Sweet Sensation, Never Mind
 Cosmos – Furry KCF 115, 2008; Goodbye Truly, Hopes & Aspirations, Indiana, The Pleasure Seekers, A promise for Tomorrow, The Visionary, Slipped Away, Keep it Up, Seagull, The Dotted Line, My Last Goodbye, Take Me

ConeBoy

15 track Soundtrack album to ConeBoy shows released 2020, FURRY RECORDS UK, CAT No. KCF119.  track listing -  1) THE SHAPE OF THINGS TO COME 2) FLAME HAIR GIRL 3) DOWN FROM THE MOUNTAIN 4) IT'S CHRISTMAS - RING THE BELLS 5) HOME 6) SEND DELETE 7) SOMETHING HAPPENED ALONG THE WAY 8) HELLS ANGEL 9) SHE IS FROM THE CITY 10) ONE IN A MILLION 11) DAYS OF WONDER 12) NOT TO FUNNY NOW 13) THE NARCISSIST 14) LOVE IS ALL 15) DOWN FROM THE MOUNTAIN - REPRISE

Compilation albums 
Spizz
 Spizz History (November 1983: Rough Trade)
 The Peel Sessions (February 1987: Strange Fruit)
 Unhinged (March 1994: Damaged Goods)
 Spizz Not Dead Shock: A Decade of Spizz History 1978 – '88 (May 1996: Cherry Red)
 Where's Captain Kirk (May 2002: Cherry Red)
 Urgh! A Music War (October 1989: A&M Records)
 Various – New Wave Soft Class-X 1 (AS5085: Antler Subway)
 Ausweis – Ausweis – Red And Black (Spizzenergi) (Paris – Théâtre De L'Eldorado Concert WW – 30/03/84) (No.13: V.I.S.A)
 Various – Checkout – SpizzEnergi / Athletico Spizz 80 – (Rough Trade – RTL-11)
 Various – Foreplay – Athletico Spizz 80 – (A&M Records – SP-17128)
 Various – London Heat Wave – Athletico Spizz 80 – (A&M Records – AMP-28008)
 To The Outside Everything – A Story of UK Post Punk-1 – 1977-1981 – (Cherry Red – CRCDBOX44)
 Various – Scheisst Auf Cover-Versionen - Hier Sind Die Originale! - Raketen-Tapes – Nr.2)
 Various – Ροκ! Μουσικός Πόλεμος - Home Video Hellas - 1982)
 Various – BBC Top Of The Pops - 823 - 13 August 1980/147085 S & 147086 S)
 Different Kinds of Dub - (Get Baque Records GBR 047)
 Earthling – Radar - (Cooltempo – 7243 8 33382 4 5)
 1980 - Brand New Rage (Cherry Red 2022, cat no. AHOYBX387) 3 x CD release, compilation

Scary Thieves;
 December 84 – Previews (1984) – Tell Me Girl 12"
 Hardest Hits Volume One (1991) – The Waiting Game 12"
 Hardest Hits Volume Two (1992) – Tell Me Girl 12"
 Techno Pop 2 (Contraseña 1998) – Tell Me Girl 12"
 Deejay Time Colour (EMI – 2605951) – Tell Me Girl 12"

Kasie Sharp
 Full On House, 1997 (DCI – DCBX 104), (featuring mixes by Fat Boy Slim)
 Masters of House (DCI – DDCD 613), 1997

References

Further reading 
 Mercer, Mick. Gothic Rock Black Book, Omnibus Press, 1988. 
 Glen, Alan. In a Big Country, Polygon, 2010.   

1960 births
Living people
People from Camberley
British rock drummers
British male drummers
English new wave musicians
Big Country members